The page details the timeline of History of Iran.  Millennia: 1st BC1st–2nd3rd

Centuries: 7th BC6th BC5th BC4th BC3rd BC2nd BC1st BCSee alsoReferencesBibliographyExternal links

33rd century BC

13th century BC

8th century BC

7th century BC

6th century BC

5th century BC

4th century BC

3rd century BC

2nd century BC

1st century BC 

 Centuries: 1st2nd3rd4th5th6th7th8th9th10th11th12th13th14th15th16th17th18th19th20th

1st century

2nd century

3rd century

4th century

5th century

6th century

7th century

8th century

9th century

10th century

11th century

12th century

13th century

14th century

15th century

16th century

17th century

18th century

19th century

20th century

21st century

See also
 List of years in Iran
 List of Islamic years

Cities in Iran:
 Timeline of Bandar Abbas
 Timeline of Hamadan
 Timeline of Isfahan
 Timeline of Kerman
 Timeline of Mashhad
 Timeline of Qom
 Timeline of Shiraz
 Timeline of Tabriz
 Timeline of Tehran
 Timeline of Yazd

References

Bibliography

 
 
 
 
  (Covers 14th–18th centuries CE)
  (Covers 1921–2009)

External links
 
 
 Timelines of History: Iran

Iranian
Years in Iran